Bankuy is a commune located in the Doumbala Department of Kossi Province, Burkina Faso.

References

Kossi Province